Raimundo Napolitano was an Italian painter of the Renaissance period. He was active in Naples during 1477. He painted frescoes for the church of S. Francesco di Chieri.

References

15th-century Italian painters
Italian male painters
Painters from Naples
Italian Renaissance painters
15th-century Neapolitan people
Year of birth unknown
Year of death unknown